

References

External links
 The government of the Ottoman empire in the time of Suleiman the Magnificent (p. 32) by Albert Howe Lybyer, in public domain
 Ottoman-Turkish conversation-grammar, a practical method of learning the Ottoman-Turkish language at the Internet Archive By V. H. Hagopian — Official Titles (p. 459)

Gubernatorial titles
Military ranks of the Ottoman Empire
Noble titles
Government of the Ottoman Empire
Positions of subnational authority
Titles of national or ethnic leadership

Ottoman Empire-related lists